Nickelodeon was an Estonian TV block which was broadcast on the Estonian TV channel TV1.  The block was launched on October 17, 1998 but was closed in 2001 due to low availability and declining viewership, The same year TV1 itself was closed moving most programs to Kanal 2, TV3, MTV Estonia, ETV & ETV2

Currently, Nickelodeon Estonia is available via Nickelodeon's Pan-European channel.

Programming 
Rugrats
Rocko's Modern Life
Hey Arnold
KaBlam! 
CatDog
SpongeBob SquarePants

Estonia
Television channels and stations established in 1998
Television channels and stations disestablished in 2001
1998 establishments in Estonia
2001 disestablishments in Estonia
Defunct television channels in Estonia
Television programming blocks